Michael Costanza is an American filmmaker and writer/director. He began his career in the Art Department on feature films at Paramount.  He then went on to direct short films and music videos. His short Mama Said screened at Sundance and in the Official Selection of films in Competition at The Cannes Film Festival and was nominated for the Palme d'Or award.  Mama Said is a critique of Race relations and pop culture of 60’s America. Mama Said also screened on The Sundance Channel.

The Collingswood Story is Costanza's screenlife horror film.  Made years before Zoom, FaceTime, and Video conferencing were mainstream, the film explores the lives of a young couple attempting a long distance relationship via webcams.  The film screened at numerous festivals including Frightfest in London and The Fearless Tales Film Festival in San Francisco. The Collingswood Story won the Best Indie Film and Best Cast Award.

Media clips
Mama Said (Award: Best Short Film)
Mama Said - Nominated for the Palme d'Or at Cannes
Mike Costanza

References

Living people
American male screenwriters
Year of birth missing (living people)